The Remarque Institute is an institute at New York University which focuses its research on contemporary Europe. It was founded in 1995 by Professor Tony R. Judt and is named after the German writer Erich Maria Remarque, whose widow made a major donation to NYU. Its aims are "to support and promote the study and debate on Europe, and to encourage and facilitate communication between Americans and Europeans".

History and context 
The Remarque Institute was established at New York University in 1995 under the direction of Tony Judt. It is named for the writer Erich Maria Remarque, whose widow Paulette Goddard made a major donation to the University.

The fall of the Berlin Wall in 1989 and all the ensuing events in eastern Europe demonstrated how important it was for the people of America and Europe to know and understand each other better. It was urgent to develop knowledge covering the whole of Europe and no longer just on its western part. From its creation, the Remarque Institute has treated the European continent as a whole and works to promote understanding and knowledge about its different constituents.

Activities 
The Remarque Institute organizes workshops, conferences and events to achieve its goals. Its various activities are organized by its academic team as well as by researchers and professors from the largest European and American universities.

References 

New York University